Robert Góralczyk (born 1 August 1974) is a Polish football manager, and current sporting director of GKS Katowice.

Coaching and management career
On 9 June 2019, Góralczyk was appointed as sporting director of GKS Katowice.

References

External links
  Profile at PZPN.pl

1974 births
Living people
Polonia Bytom managers
Motor Lublin managers
Polish football managers
Sportspeople from Bytom
Przebój Wolbrom managers